Blackett is a lunar impact crater that lies on the far side of the Moon, behind the southwest limb. It lies beyond the southeast outer ring of the immense Mare Orientale basin. The formation of that major feature has left Blackett deeply marked with ridge features trending from the northwest. Much of the crater has been shaped by the ejecta from Mare Orientale, particularly along the western half of the crater.

Overall this crater is heavily eroded, with several craters overlaying the southern rim, and smaller formations overlaying the western and northwestern rim. The interior floor has been roughened by ejecta, leaving only parts of the southwest interior in their previous relatively level and featureless condition.

The crater Stetson lies on the southwest rim.

Satellite craters
By convention these features are identified on lunar maps by placing the letter on the side of the crater midpoint that is closest to Blackett.

References

 
 
 
 
 
 
 
 
 
 
 
 

Impact craters on the Moon